Kusi Kwame (born 9 August 1989) is a Ghanaian-German footballer who most recently played as a full-back for 1. FC Phönix Lübeck.

References

External links
 

Living people
1989 births
German sportspeople of Ghanaian descent
Ghanaian footballers
German footballers
Footballers from Hamburg
Association football fullbacks
3. Liga players
Regionalliga players
VfL 93 Hamburg players
USC Paloma players
Holstein Kiel players
Holstein Kiel II players
VfR Neumünster players
SC Fortuna Köln players
FC Rot-Weiß Erfurt players
Hamburger SV II players
1. FC Phönix Lübeck players